Euseius eucalypti is a species of mite in the family Phytoseiidae.

References

eucalypti
Articles created by Qbugbot
Animals described in 1967